Stella K. Abraham Beit Midrash for Women, commonly known as Migdal Oz, is an Orthodox Jewish institution of higher Torah study for women located in the Kibbutz Migdal Oz in Gush Etzion in the West Bank.

Overview 
Migdal Oz is the sister school of Yeshivat Har Etzion, sharing its general philosophy, leadership and many faculty members. The total student population is 180, including 30 from the U.S., Canada, and England, and more than 40 in the advanced teachers' training program. The director of Migdal Oz is Esti Rosenberg, whose father, Rabbi Aharon Lichtenstein, along with Rabbi Yehuda Amital, provided the school with rabbinic guidance and often make  religious policy decisions. The curriculum includes Talmud study in keeping with the halakhic rulings of Rosenberg's grandfather, Rabbi Joseph B. Soloveitchik. Notable alumni include: Elana Stein Hain and Gilah Kletenik.

History 
Migdal Oz was established in 1997 by Yeshivat Har Etzion. It was located in a trailer which now serves as the kibbutz's sewing room. A permanent building with a study hall, classrooms, and a dining hall, was completed in 2003.

The program began as a framework for Israeli high school graduates prior to doing Sherut Leumi (National service) or being drafted into the  Israel Defense Forces. Since then, it has expanded to include women who have completed their military service, as well as foreign students. Many combine their studies at Migdal Oz with the Teacher Training Program of Herzog College.

See also 
 Yeshivat Har Etzion
 Torah study
 Religious Zionism

References

External links 
 

Educational institutions established in 1997
Orthodox Jewish schools for women
Jewish seminaries
Zionist organizations
Religious Zionism
Gush Etzion
Yeshivat Har Etzion
Yeshivas in the West Bank
1997 establishments in Israel